Uladzimir Henadzievich Zhyharau (born June 12, 1992 in Minsk) is a Belarusian swimmer, who specialized in long-distance freestyle events. Zhyharau qualified for the men's 1500 m freestyle, as a member of the Belarusian swimming team, at the 2012 Summer Olympics in London, by attaining a B-standard entry time of 15:28.22. He challenged six other swimmers on the first heat, including 17-year-old Jan Micka of the Czech Republic and two-time Olympian Ediz Yıldırımer of Turkey. Zhyharau finished the heat in sixth place by nearly fourteen seconds behind Bulgaria's Ventsislav Aydarski, recording the second-slowest time of 15:48.67. Zhyharau failed to advance into the final, as he placed thirtieth overall in the preliminaries.

References

External links
NBC Olympics Profile

1992 births
Belarusian male freestyle swimmers
Living people
Olympic swimmers of Belarus
Swimmers at the 2012 Summer Olympics
Sportspeople from Minsk